Hypericum annulatum subsp. afromontanum is a subspecies of Hypericum annulatum. It can be found in Ethiopia, Kenya, Tanzania and Uganda. It was described by Arthur Allman Bullock.

References

annulatum subsp. afromontanum
Plant subspecies
Plants described in 1932
Flora of Ethiopia
Flora of Kenya
Flora of Tanzania
Flora of Uganda